On November 7, 1972, the District of Columbia held an election for its non-voting House delegate representing the District of Columbia's at-large congressional district. The winner of the race was Walter E. Fauntroy (D), who won his first re-election after winning the special election in the previous year.  All elected members would serve in 93rd United States Congress.

The non-voting delegate to the United States House of Representatives from the District of Columbia is elected for two-year terms, as are all other Representatives and Delegates minus the Resident Commissioner of Puerto Rico, who is elected to a four-year term.

Candidates 
Walter E. Fauntroy, a Democrat, sought re-election for his second term to the United States House of Representatives. Fauntroy was opposed in this election by Republican challenger William Chin-Lee who received 25.12%, and D.C. Statehood Party candidate Charles I. Cassell who received 11.92%.  This resulted in Fauntroy being elected with 60.64% of the vote.

Results

See also
 United States House of Representatives elections in the District of Columbia

References 

United States House
District of Columbia
1972